The Kawasaki Eliminator is a cruiser-type motorcycle that has been produced in several variants since its introduction in 1985 as the 900 Eliminator.  Currently billed as a "power cruiser", the first two versions of the bike, namely the 1985 Eliminator and 1986 ZL900 models, were almost street replicas of a drag style bike, featuring shaft drive, the ZX900 close-ratio gearbox and forward seating. The engine for both of these machines was the same motor available in the 900ccm Ninja of the same year, albeit with different exhaust and intake configurations.

Available in black for 2005, the Eliminator 125's styling features include a stepped seat with laid-back riding comfort for two, a stretched 3.4-gallon fuel tank, straight-flow exhaust and chrome-plated single headlight.

In March 2023   Kawasaki announced new version of Eliminator 400 equipped with 399cc engine from Kawasaki Z400.

Models

ZL900
Introduced in 1985, and only produced for 2 years. It was produced as the ZL900 A1 Eliminator in 1985 and the ZL900 A2 in 1986, the ZL900 evolved from the Kawasaki GPZ900R. The ZL900 was designed to evoke images of the wildly successful Z1 drag bikes, with a bobbed rear fender, short travel fork, large rear tire, fat chromed mufflers, a small fuel tank and low straight handlebars.
The ZL900 engine was a transplanted and slightly modified version of the liquid-cooled Inline 4 introduced in the 1984 Kawasaki ZX900 Ninja. Kawasaki used smaller 32 mm carburetors (the ZX900 used 34 mm), different timing and camshafts with less duration.  This gave the engine a different personality, trading the Ninja's high-end power for low-end and mid-range performance that was more suitable for a cruiser.  
At the time, the ZL900 was the only bike in its segment using an Inline-four powerplant instead of a V4 configuration. These bikes were produced by Kawasaki in Lincoln, Nebraska for the American market.

ZL1000
The ZL1000 was an evolution of the ZL900, sporting a larger engine shared with the ZG1000 Concours and 34 mm carburetors.
The styling of the ZL1000 was much more conservative than that of the 900, with a longer rear fender and a much larger fuel tank, the 2,500 models of this motorcycle were only available for, 1987 and 1988, but only sold in UK, Australia and the US in 1987. 100 HP models were sold in Germany, France, and Sweden. The ZL1000 shares the same strong following as the ZL900.

ZL750
The ZL750 was sold from 1986 to 1989 as a mild-mannered version of its big brothers.

ZL600

The ZL600 produced from 1986 to 1997 had the same type of transplant as its bigger siblings: a slightly modified engine from the Kawasaki Ninja 600.

ZL400
The ZL400 produced from 1986 to ceased production in 1994. It uses the Gpz400r 4 cyl 16v engine in a milder tune.   Like larger models, all versions of the ZL400 had a shaft drive.

VN250
This model started production in 1998.

EL250 (D5)
The EL250 had a production run from 1988 to 1997 at 
which point it was superseded by the VN250.

EL175
The EL175 was manufactured and sold as the Kawasaki Bajaj Eliminator in India by Bajaj Auto in collaboration with Kawasaki. The export model is called BN175 and is powered by a 175cc, air cooled, four-stroke engine.

EL125

The Eliminator 125 is Kawasaki's entry level cruiser.  The Motorcycle Safety Foundation uses this bike in their beginner riders courses.  It is powered by a 125 cc, air-cooled, four-stroke, single-cylinder engine. It is sometimes called the BN125 and was discontinued in the UK mid-2007.

References

Eliminator 125
Cruiser motorcycles
Motorcycles introduced in 1985